Beach Boulevard is an east–west road running from Jacksonville, Florida, United States east to Jacksonville Beach.  Most of the road is part of U.S. Route 90 and unsigned as State Road 212 (SR 212), and a small portion at the eastern end is unsigned as County Road 212 (CR 212).

Route description
SR 212 begins at the interchange between US 90 and SR 10, where it heads east through the commercial areas of Jacksonville.  Near its eastern terminus, it crosses the B.B. McCormick Bridge, leaving Jacksonville and entering Jacksonville Beach, continuing east through commercial establishments, and ending at SR A1A in Jacksonville Beach.  Beach Boulevard continues for two blocks eastward as CR 212.

History
What is now called Beach Boulevard is actually an extension that was added to the original, post-Civil War road called Hogan Road, which stretched from the South bank of the St Johns River downtown, and led Southeast across the bridge over Little Pottsburg Creek and moved onward toward St Augustine.  Hogan Road was named after the Hogan Family that were the first white settlers in Duval County.  Hogan Road had two sections, the Northbank section moving north from the north bank of the St Johns River downtown, and the Southbank section moving south from the south bank of the St Johns River downtown. In the late 1930s, a new road called Beach Boulevard was built from the beaches toward Downtown Jacksonville until it intersected with the Southbank section of Hogan Road just west of what is now called Parental Home Road. The Southbank section of Hogan Road between Parental Home Road and the South bank of the St Johns River downtown was renamed Beach Boulevard and added to the new section, thus allowing the new Beach Boulevard to exist under one name from the South bank of the St Johns River, all the way out to the Atlantic Ocean. Other changes were made in the 1950s, when Interstate I-95 bisected the new Beach Blvd just south of the riverbank. All that is left of the original Hogan Road is the Northbank section downtown, and a small piece of the original Southbank section that stretches from just west of Parental Home Road South across the Little Pottsburg Creek, and ends at the intersection of Southside Boulevard.

Prior to the 1945 renumbering, it was State Road 376, added to the state road system by the Florida Legislature in 1937.  The road was built on the right-of-way of the Florida East Coast Railway Mayport Branch (Jacksonville and Atlantic Railroad) to relieve traffic on the parallel Atlantic Boulevard (pre-1945 State Road 140, now State Road 10). Construction began before World War II but was suspended between fall 1941 and 1945.  After the renumbering, it was reassigned to SR 212, and dedicated December 17, 1949, along with the B.B. McCormick Bridge over the Intracoastal Waterway.

Major intersections

References

Roads in Jacksonville, Florida
Roads in Duval County, Florida
U.S. Route 90
Streets in Florida